Lord Howe may refer to:

 Earl Howe (also Viscount Howe and Baron Howe), a peerage title in the United Kingdom, including:
 Richard Howe, 1st Earl Howe (1726–1799), Admiral of the Fleet
 Geoffrey Howe (1926–2015), later Baron Howe of Aberavon, the longest-serving British cabinet minister under Margaret Thatcher

Geography 

Lord Howe Island, an island in the Pacific Ocean administered by Australia
Lord Howe Atoll, also known as Ontong Java Atoll (not to be confused with Lord Howe Island)
Lord Howe Province, a marine biogeographic region of Australia
Lord Howe Rise, an underwater plateau in the Pacific Ocean
Lord Howe Seamount Chain, a seamount chain on northern Lord Howe Rise

Biology 
There is a number of species endemic to Lord Howe Island whose name includes the words Lord Howe:

Birds 

Lord Howe boobook, the extinct bird whose scientific name is Ninox novaeseelandiae albaria
Lord Howe currawong or Strepera graculina crissalis
Lord Howe fantail or Rhipidura fuliginosa cervina, extinct
Lord Howe gerygone or Gerygone insularis, extinct
Lord Howe golden whistler or Pachycephala pectoralis contempta
Lord Howe morepork, another name for the Lord Howe boobook
Lord Howe pigeon or Columba vitiensis godmanae, extinct
Lord Howe red-crowned parakeet or Cyanoramphus novaezelandiae subflavescens, extinct
Lord Howe silvereye or Zosterops lateralis tephropleurus
Lord Howe starling or Aplonis fuscus hullianus, extinct
Lord Howe swamphen or Porphyrio albus, extinct
Lord Howe woodhen or Gallirallus sylvestris, endangered

Other species 

Lord Howe flax snail or Placostylus bivaricosus, an endangered snail
Lord Howe Island butterflyfish or Amphichaetodon howensis, a fish
Lord Howe Island skink or Cyclodina lichenigera, a lizard
Lord Howe long-eared bat or Nyctophilus howensis, an extinct or endangered bat

Other uses 

Lord Howe's action, or the Glorious First of June, a painting by Philippe-Jacques de Loutherbourg
Lord Howe Monster, a fictional creature fought by Godzilla
Lord Howe, a Scilly packet in service between Penzance and the Isles of Scilly